Pallu Padama Paathukka is a 2023 Indian Tamil-language zombie comedy film written and directed by Vijay Varadharaj. The film stars Attakathi Dinesh and Sanchita Shetty in the lead roles with Sha Ra, Rajendran, Jagan, Linga, Sai Dheena, Hareesh Peradi, Abdul, Rishikanth, G. M. Kumar, Anand Babu, Augustine and Dhivakar portraying supporting roles. The film was released theatrically on 3 March 2023.
 
It is the directorial debut film for Vijay Varadharaj before directing the web-series Kuthukku Pathu. The film's title is a double entendre, referring to both zombie bites and fellatio. It was met with negative reviews upon release.

Plot
The film starts with Gopi, a dubbing artist, being kidnapped by a blind rich man's henchmen, and they beat him. The blind man ordered Gopi to take him to Kunju Thanni Forest. Gopi also accepts the offer because he needs the money. Gopi took the blind man to the forest, and Gopi saw a zombie. After a few years, a group of strangers try to commit suicide by jumping from a cliff in Kunju Thanni Forest. But they share their reason for committing suicide. and they meet Mahesh, who calls them to drink alcohol. The guys started drinking, and Mahesh shares his past, including how he got arrested by the police and escaped from jail. One of the guys, named Arumai Nayagam, accidentally entered a laboratory that was filled with zombies. When the group of guys became terrified, a girl appeared and rescued them from the zombies. Her name is Sathya, and Mahesh falls for her. She gave each of the guys a bun. They eat it and fall asleep, and when they wake up, all of them have been tied up with a rope. Sathya was interested in conducting zombie research; that's why she did that. While zombies are getting close to them, Mahesh starts to pray after hearing his prayer. Sathya decides to save them, and she does. While saving them, she got bitten by a zombie, so Mahesh and his friends took her to the home of Sathya. While going to the house, Parthasarathy sacrifices his life to save Mahesh and Sathya. She injected herself with the antidote, and she tells her past. Her father's name is Rohit Sharma; he is the one who made all the mess. He was in research to make humans live after death; the project was named "Project Cthulhu". Rohit made a virus that made zombies, and the zombies bit Rohit. Sathya saved her father from zombies, and Rohit turned Hitler's body into a zombie. When the flashback ended, the team went out of the house, where they met Gopi, the dubbing artist. Arumai Nayagam told Mahesh to propose to her when she was alone, so he went to propose to her. While Mahesh was proposing to Sathya, Hitler's zombie army captured her and brought her to Hitler's residence. Gopi told Mahesh that Hitler thinks that Sathya is Hitler's wife because she looks like Hitler's wife. Mahesh and friends planned to save her, and they saved her by tricking Hitler's zombie. In the end, Mahesh and Sathya were united.

Cast

Production 
The film's final schedule was shot in May 2018. The film is the second zombie genre film in Tamil, and they scheduled to release the film on June 2019. The motion poster and teaser for the film were released on February 22, 2020 and the crew again announced the film is set to be released on 13 March 2020. But the film was delayed for many years, and it was released on March 3, 2023.

Music 
The music of the film is composed by Balamurali Balu.

Reception
Logesh Balachandran of The Times of India who gave 1.5 stars out of 5 stars after reviewing the film stated that " The film is disappointing, with a weak plot, innuendos, and homophobic dialogues. The second half is poorly written, and there is no clear picture of the gang led by Hareesh Peradi."Navein Darshan of Cinema Express who gave 1.5 stars out of 5 stars after reviewing the film stated that,"The zombie comedy gives horrible adult entertainers a run for their money with some alarmingly lazy writing".Critic from Dinathanthi  noted that " Director Vijay Varadaraj has told a horror and comedy story with zombies."

References

External links 

2020s Tamil-language films
Indian comedy thriller films
2023 films
Indian comedy horror films
Indian zombie films
Zombie comedy films